Scott D. Sandall is an American politician and a Republican member of the Utah State Senate representing District 1. He previously represented District 17 from 2019 to 2023 prior to redistricting.

Early life and career 
Sandall earned his BS degree in Agricultural Economics from Brigham Young University in 1985 and currently works as a farmer and rancher. He lives in Tremonton, Utah with his wife Christie.

Political career 
In 2014, Sandall ran as a Republican for the open seat in District 17, vacated by incumbent Ronda Menlove, who chose not to seek re-election. He faced Dorene Schulze-Stever from the Democratic Party and Lee H. Phipps from the Constitution Party in the general election. Sandall won the general election with 5,592 votes (77.3%) to Schulze-Stever's 1,035 votes (14.31%) and Phipps's 607 votes (8.39%).

During the 2016 legislative session, Sandall served on the Infrastructure and General Government Appropriations Subcommittee, the House Natural Resources, Agriculture and Environment Committee, and the House Economic Development and Workforce Services Committee.

2016 sponsored legislation 

Sandall passed three of the four bills he introduced during the 2016 General Session, giving him a 75% passage rate. He also floor sponsored SB0075 Water Rights Adjudication Amendments and SB0200S01 Compensatory Mitigation Program for Sage Grouse.

References

External links 
 Official page at the Utah State Legislature
 Scott Sandall at Ballotpedia
 Scott Sandall at the National Institute on Money in State Politics

Place of birth missing (living people)
Year of birth missing (living people)
Living people
Mayors of places in Utah
Republican Party members of the Utah House of Representatives
People from Cache County, Utah
Utah State University alumni
21st-century American politicians
People from Tremonton, Utah